Lion Axwijk (born 18 March 1984 in Amsterdam, Netherlands) is a Dutch footballer.

Club career
He played for Eredivisie league club RKC Waalwijk during the 2005–2006 season but was loaned to Eerste Divisie club SC Veendam in January 2006. He joined AGOVV Apeldoorn on a free transfer in summer 2006 and signed for two years.

He later played for amateur sides IJsselmeervogels, SV Spakenburg, ASV De Dijk and OFC before joining Hellas Sport.

He also played for the Dutch police team.

Personal life
His brother Iwan Axwijk played professionally for Eerste Divisie club Haarlem.

References

External links
 First team squad - Hellas Sport

1984 births
Living people
Footballers from Amsterdam
Association football fullbacks
Dutch footballers
RKC Waalwijk players
SC Veendam players
AGOVV Apeldoorn players
IJsselmeervogels players
SV Spakenburg players
Eredivisie players
Eerste Divisie players
Dutch police officers
ASV De Dijk players